Giacomo Galletti (died 1574) was a Roman Catholic prelate who served as Bishop of Alessano (1560–1574).

Biography
On 2 October 1560, Giacomo Galletti was appointed during the papacy of Pope Pius IV as Bishop of Alessano. He served as Bishop of Alessano until his death in September 1574.

Episcopal succession
While bishop, he was the principal co-consecrator of:
Girolamo Gaddi, Bishop of Cortona (1563); 
Maurice MacGibbon, Archbishop of Cashel (1567);  
Alexandre de Bardi, Bishop of Saint-Papoul (1567); and 
Pietro Giacomo Malombra, Bishop of Cariati e Cerenzia (1568).

References

External links and additional sources
 (for Chronology of Bishops) 
 (for Chronology of Bishops) 

16th-century Italian Roman Catholic bishops
Bishops appointed by Pope Pius IV
1574 deaths